The 2023 German Open (officially known as the Yonex German Open 2023 for sponsorship reasons) was a badminton tournament that took place at the Westenergie Sporthalle in Mülheim, Germany, from 7 to 12 March 2023 and had a total prize pool of $210,000.

Tournament
The 2023 German Open was the fifth tournament of the 2023 BWF World Tour and was part of the German Open championships, which had been held since 1955. The tournament was organized by the German Badminton Association with sanction from the Badminton World Federation.

Venue
This international tournament was held at the Westenergie Sporthalle at Mülheim, Germany.

Point distribution
Below is the point distribution table for each phase of the tournament based on the BWF points system for the BWF World Tour Super 300 event.

Prize pool 
The total prize money for this tournament was US$210,000, distributed of the prize money in accordance with BWF regulations.

Men's singles

Seeds 

 Lee Zii Jia (Second round)
 Kunlavut Vitidsarn (First round)
 Kodai Naraoka (First round)
 Loh Kean Yew (Second round)
 Lu Guangzu (Quarter-finals)
 Lakshya Sen (First round)
 Zhao Junpeng (Second round)
 Shi Yuqi (First round)

Finals

Top half

Section 1

Section 2

Bottom half

Section 3

Section 4

Women's singles

Seeds 

 Akane Yamaguchi (Champion)
 An Se-young (Final)
 Chen Yufei (Semi-finals)
 He Bingjiao (Semi-finals)
 Wang Zhiyi (Quarter-finals)
 Ratchanok Intanon (Withdrew)
 Han Yue (First round)
 Pornpawee Chochuwong (Quarter-finals)

Finals

Top half

Section 1

Section 2

Bottom half

Section 3

Section 4

Men's doubles

Seeds 

 Aaron Chia / Soh Wooi Yik (Second round)
 Takuro Hoki / Yugo Kobayashi (Quarter-finals)
 Liu Yuchen / Ou Xuanyi (First round)
 Kim Astrup / Anders Skaarup Rasmussen (Quarter-finals)
 Ong Yew Sin / Teo Ee Yi (Second round)
 Liang Weikeng / Wang Chang (First round)
 Choi Sol-gyu / Kim Won-ho (Champions)
 Mark Lamsfuß / Marvin Seidel (Second round)

Finals

Top half

Section 1

Section 2

Bottom half

Section 3

Section 4

Women's doubles

Seeds 

 Nami Matsuyama / Chiharu Shida (Final)
 Jeong Na-eun / Kim Hye-jeong (Quarter-finals)
 Pearly Tan / Thinaah Muralitharan (Semi-finals)
 Kim So-yeong / Kong Hee-yong (Semi-finals)
 Yuki Fukushima / Sayaka Hirota (Quarter-finals)
 Mayu Matsumoto / Wakana Nagahara (Quarter-finals)
 Gabriela Stoeva / Stefani Stoeva (Quarter-finals)
 Baek Ha-na / Lee So-hee (Champions)

Finals

Top half

Section 1

Section 2

Bottom half

Section 3

Section 4

Mixed doubles

Seeds 

 Yuta Watanabe / Arisa Higashino (Second round)
 Thom Gicquel / Delphine Delrue (Quarter-finals)
 Tan Kian Meng / Lai Pei Jing (First round)
 Mark Lamsfuß / Isabel Lohau (Second round)
 Feng Yanzhe / Huang Dongping (Champions)
 Seo Seung-jae / Chae Yoo-jung (Second round)
 Robin Tabeling / Selena Piek (Withdrew)
 Yuki Kaneko / Misaki Matsutomo (Second round)

Finals

Top half

Section 1

Section 2

Bottom half

Section 3

Section 4

References

External links
Tournament Link

German Open (badminton)
German Open
German Open (badminton)
German Open (badminton)